Dan Roth is the Eduardo D. Glandt Distinguished Professor of Computer and Information Science at the University of Pennsylvania.

Biography 
Roth got his B.A summa cum laude in Mathematics from the Technion, Israel and his Ph.D in Computer Science from Harvard University in 1995. He taught at the University of Illinois at Urbana-Champaign from 1998 to 2017 before moving to the University of Pennsylvania.

Professional career 
Roth is a Fellow of the American Association for the Advancement of Science (AAAS), the Association for Computing Machinery (ACM), the Association for the Advancement of Artificial Intelligence (AAAI), and the Association of Computational Linguistics (ACL).

Roth’s research focuses on the computational foundations of intelligent behavior. He develops theories and systems pertaining to intelligent behavior using a unified methodology, at the heart of which is the idea that learning has a central role in intelligence.  His work centers around the study of machine learning and inference methods to facilitate natural language understanding. In doing that he has pursued several interrelated lines of work that span multiple aspects of this problem - from fundamental questions in learning and inference and how they interact, to the study of a range of natural language processing (NLP) problems and developing advanced machine learning based tools for natural language applications.

Roth has made seminal contribution to the fusion of Learning and Reasoning, Machine Learning with weak, incidental supervision, and to machine learning and inference approaches to natural language understanding. Roth has worked on probabilistic reasoning (including its complexity and probabilistic lifted inference ), Constrained Conditional Models (ILP formulations of NLP problems) and constraints-driven learning, part-based (constellation) methods in object recognition, response based Learning,  He has developed NLP and Information extraction tools that are being used broadly by researchers and commercially, including NER, coreference resolution, wikification, SRL, and ESL text correction.

Roth is the Editor-in-Chief of the Journal of Artificial Intelligence Research (JAIR).

References 

Year of birth missing (living people)
Living people
Harvard University alumni
Israeli computer scientists
University of Illinois Urbana-Champaign faculty
Fellows of the American Association for the Advancement of Science
Technion – Israel Institute of Technology alumni
Fellows of the Association for Computing Machinery
Fellows of the Association for the Advancement of Artificial Intelligence
Fellows of the Association for Computational Linguistics
Natural language processing researchers
Artificial intelligence researchers
Machine learning researchers